The 2010 Central Michigan Chippewas football team represented Central Michigan University during the 2010 NCAA Division I FBS football season. The Chippewas, led by first-year head coach Dan Enos, compete in the West Division of the Mid-American Conference and played their home games at Kelly/Shorts Stadium. They finished the season 3–9, 2–6 in MAC play.

Schedule

Game summaries

vs. Hampton

at Temple

at Eastern Michigan

Scoring summary

1st Quarter
 4:13 CMU – Cody Wilson 21-yard pass from Ryan Radcliff (David Harman kick) 7-0 CMU
 0:47 CMU – Paris Cotton 13-yard run (David Harman kick) 14-0 CMU

2nd Quarter
 4:28 EMU – Dwayne Priest 2-yard run (Sean Graham kick) 14-7 CMU
 1:45 CMU – Paris Cotton 1-yard run (David Harman kick) 21-7 CMU

3rd Quarter
 13:30 CMU – Paris Cotton 61-yard run (David Harman kick) 28-7 CMU
 8:09 EMU – Donald Scott 52-yard pass from Alex Gillett (Sean Graham kick) 28-14 CMU
 4:20 CMU – Kito Poblah 14-yard pass from Ryan Radcliff (David Harman kick) 35-14 CMU

4th Quarter
 13:42 CMU – Mike Petrucci 43-yard fumble return (David Harman kick) 42-14 CMU
 8:09 CMU – David Harman 41-yard field goal 45-14 CMU
 6:25 CMU – Zurlon Tipton 20-yard run (David Harman kick) 52-14 CMU

References

Central Michigan
Central Michigan Chippewas football seasons
Central Michigan Chippewas football